Rachele Fogar (born 31 July 1991 in Milan) is an Italian model, television personality and influencer. She lives in Milan.

Biography 
Rachele Fogar is the daughter of Ambrogio Fogar and Katalin Szijarto; her father is Italian and her mother is Hungarian.

Rachele Fogar started modeling when she was an adolescent. She studied at Milan, at liceo classico Giuseppe Parini and liceo classico Tito Livio. In 2014, she graduated from the Università Cattolica del Sacro Cuore (Faculty of Linguistic Sciences and Foreign Literatures) with a degree thesis on her father by title No Limits, l'esperienza giornalistica di Ambrogio Fogar.

For her work she has traveled all over the world. She is polyglot; the languages are: Italian, English, Spanish, Hungarian, French, Russian, Thai, Chinese and Swahili. She has worked for several leading fashion brands and posed for various photo shoots, editorials, covers and commercials working with internationally renowned photographers. Brands with which Rachele Fogar has worked include Armani, Prada, Brunello Cucinelli, Celine and Off-White. She writes for newspapers and magazines; she is a journalist for Corriere della Sera and Diva e Donna; her first article appeared in 2013 for "Diva e Donna". In addition, she was a Wind testimonial and she was chosen for the project "It Girls" for Luuk Magazine.

In 2005 Rachele Fogar was one of the protagonists of the documentary Ambrogio Fogar, l'ultimo eroe broadcast by Rete 4 in prime time.

In 2014 Rachele was one of the protagonists of the television program Calzedonia Ocean Girls - backstage broadcast by Sky 3D. In the same year she was one of the protagonists of the reality television Calzedonia Ocean Girls broadcast by Sky Uno/Cielo in prime time.

In 2017, for a month, Rachele traveled alone and explored Thailand where she also explored an elephant orphanage.

In 2018 Rachele Fogar, with Linda Morselli, was one of the protagonists of the reality television Pechino Express 7 - Avventura in Africa broadcast by Rai 2 in prime time. The couple was called  "mannequin" and they obtained third place. During Pechino Express,  she played in the role of Clodia.

In 2018 Rachele took part at the "White Party" of Atelier Emé, and took part in international sailing regattas obtaining various trophies and podiums.

In 2019 she took part in sailing regattas with Davide Besana: second place at "Assoregata" 22nd edition "ORC B", fourth place at "Assoregata" 22nd edition "Generale ORC A + B", fourth place at "Assoregata" 22nd edition "Generale ORC + Gran Crociera", first place at "XV Raduno Vele Storiche" "VSV6" (first sailing), first place at "XV Raduno Vele Storiche" "VSV6" (second and final sailing), first place at "XV Raduno Vele Storiche" "Generale VSV6"  and first place "Trofeo Artiglio" 2nd edition "Vele Storiche".

In 2020 she took part in Casa Marcello hosted by Marcello Cirillo, in this program takes part also Linda Morselli; in this year they visited and explored Sicily in a tour named Sicilia Express designed by them.

From 2021 she was a team member of "Mare Nostrum": project Rotary International for the protection of aquatic ecosystems.

In 2021 Rachele took part in expeditions of "Blue Panda", sailboat of WWF (World Wide Fund for Nature): explorations of MPA (Marine protected area) in the Mediterranean Sea. In 2021 she took part in a sailing regatta of the Yacht Club Italiano with Enrico Chieffi and Mauro Pelaschier: seventh place at "Millevele" 33rd edition with ketch "Leon Pancaldo" in category "A Rosso" and seventh place in category "General".

Personal life 
Rachele is a sportswoman (skydiving, swimming, scuba diving, equestrianism, hiking, bungee jumping, canoeing, kayaking, Muay Thai, trekking, running, skiing, sailing, snowboarding, paragliding, winter sports, water sports and others); she holds various licenses, including for boating and parachuting.

Since 2021 she has been in a relationship with Italian entrepreneur Guido Nanni Falck, son of Giorgio Falck (of Falck Group) and Rosanna Schiaffino.

Her best friend is Linda Morselli with whom she often works.

Rachele is an animal lover; in addition to owning pets, in 2020 Rachele adopted a polar bear.

Filmography
 Ambrogio Fogar, l'ultimo eroe (Rete 4, 2005) - docufilm
 Pechino Express - Il figlio di Spartacus (Rai 2, 2018)

Television 
 Calzedonia Ocean Girls - backstage (Sky 3D, 2014)
 Calzedonia Ocean Girls (Sky Uno/Cielo, 2014)
 Pechino Express 7 - Avventura in Africa (Rai 2, 2018)
 Linea blu (Rai 1, 2019)
 Casa Marcello (Teleuniverso/Telemia/Brixia Channel/Calabria Sona, 2020)

Web television
 Casa Marcello (2020)

Sailing regattas 
With Davide Besana
 2019 - "Assoregata" 22nd edition "ORC B": 2nd place
 2019 - "Assoregata" 22nd edition "Generale ORC A + B": 4th place
 2019 - "Assoregata" 22nd edition "Generale ORC + Gran Crociera": 4th place
 2019 - "XV Raduno Vele Storiche" "VSV6" (first sailing): 1st place
 2019 - "XV Raduno Vele Storiche" "VSV6" (second and final sailing): 1st place
 2019 - "XV Raduno Vele Storiche" "Generale VSV6": 1st place 
 2019 - "Trofeo Artiglio" 2nd edition "Vele Storiche": 1st place

With Enrico Chieffi and Mauro Pelaschier
 2021 - "Millevele" 33rd edition category "A Rosso": 7th place
 2021 - "Millevele" 33rd edition category "General": 7th place

See also 
 Ambrogio Fogar
 Linda Morselli

References

External links 

  
 
 
 

1991 births
Living people
Italian female models
Participants in Italian reality television series
Università Cattolica del Sacro Cuore alumni
Italian people of Hungarian descent